The 2022–23 season is the 143rd season in the existence of Preston North End Football Club and the club's eighth consecutive season in the Championship. In addition to the league, they will also compete in the 2022–23 FA Cup and the 2022–23 EFL Cup. The season covers the period from July 2022 to 30 June 2023.

Squad

 All appearances and goals up to date as of 28 January 2022.

Statistics

Players with names in italics and marked * were on loan from another club for the whole of their season with Preston North End.

|-
!colspan=14|Players who left the club during the season:

|}

Goals record

Disciplinary record

Transfers

In

Out

Loans in

Loans out

Pre-season and friendlies
On 26 May, PNE announced their first pre-season friendlies, against Bamber Bridge and Accrington Stanley. A pre-season training camp in Alicante was also confirmed by the club. A home fixture against Scottish side Heart of Midlothian was later added to the schedule. A fourth friendly, against Leicester City was confirmed. As part of the training camp in Spain, a friendly with Getafe was announced.

Competitions

Overall record

Championship

League table

Results summary

Matches

On 23 June, the league fixtures were announced.

FA Cup

PNE entered the competition in the third round and were drawn at home to Huddersfield Town. In the fourth round draw on 8th Jan 2020, a home tie against English giants Tottenham Hotspur to be played 28th Jan 2023.

EFL Cup

PNE were drawn away to Huddersfield Town in the first round and Wolverhampton Wanderers in the second round.

References

External links

Preston North End F.C. seasons
Preston North End F.C.
English football clubs 2022–23 season